Subhash Singh or Subash Singh may refer to 

 Subhash Singh (Bihar politician)
 Subhash Chandra Singh Odisha politician
 Subhash Singh football player